Martin J. Jackley (born October 13, 1970) is an American attorney and politician who is currently serving as the Attorney General of South Dakota since 2023, having previously served from 2009 to 2019. He assumed office as Attorney General again in 2023 after winning the 2022 election unopposed. He previously served as the 39th United States Attorney for the District of South Dakota.  He ran unsuccessfully for Governor of South Dakota in 2018, losing to Kristi Noem.

Early life and education
Jackley was raised in Sturgis, South Dakota, and graduated from Sturgis Brown High School in 1988. He graduated cum laude from the South Dakota School of Mines and Technology in 1992 with his Bachelor of Science in electrical engineering. He earned his Juris Doctor from the University of South Dakota School of Law in 1995.

Legal career
From 1995 through 1997, Jackley served as a judicial law clerk for the then-former Chief Judge Richard Battey of the United States District Court for the District of South Dakota. Jackley joined the Rapid City law firm of Gunderson, Palmer, Nelson, and Ashmore. As a partner, his practice areas focused on construction & engineering law and real property disputes.  At that time, he also served as a Special Assistant Attorney General for South Dakota prosecuting controlled substance felonies.

United States Attorney (2006–2009)
In 2006, Jackley was recommended by U.S. Senator John Thune to replaced James E. McMahon and later nominated by President George W. Bush to be United States Attorney for the District of South Dakota.  Jackley was unanimously confirmed by the U.S. Senate. He was named the South Dakota Prosecutor of the Year in 2008 from the South Dakota State’s Attorneys Association. Jackley was succeeded as U.S. Attorney by Brendan Johnson.

Attorney General of South Dakota (2009–2019)
Governor Mike Rounds appointed Jackley to succeed Larry Long as Attorney General of South Dakota in 2009. Jackley won reelection in 2010 and in 2014.

Tenure

EB-5 Scandal
EB-5 was a national investor-visa program which granted green cards to undocumented immigrants and their families who have invested $500,000 in approved but not guaranteed investments.  South Dakota and Vermont were the only states that managed EB-5 funds through a state controlled entity. 
On October 20, 2013, Richard Benda died from a gunshot wound.  Approximately a month and a half later Jackley stated that the death was a suicide.  Initially it was questioned how a man could kill oneself with a shotgun.  Then an updated attorney general’s report said that a stick was used without explanation.  Benda had served as Governor Mike Rounds director of economic development.  Nearly 3 years after Benda’s death, Jackley charged Joop Bollen relating to the EB-5 scandal with five felony counts of unauthorized disposal of personal property to security interest.  In February 2017, Bollen plead guilty to one count of the little-known crime of “unauthorized disposal of personal property subject to a security interest” and was sentenced to a $2,000 fine and two years of probation.

GEAR UP scandal
On September 17, 2015, Scott Westerhuis shot and killed his four children, his wife, Nicole, and then set his house on fire, before killing himself.  Westerhuis was the business manager of Mid Central Educational Cooperative, which was contracted out by the state to distribute grant money. Hours before the Westerhuis home was found burning, Mid-Central Educational Cooperative, where Scott Westerhuis was the business manager, had lost a multi-million dollar state contract.  The decision by the state came after a series of financial problems turned up in audits of the business that administered a program that encourages Native American Students to go to college, called GEAR UP.  Nearly, three years later in June 2018, Jackley lost the first of three possible GEAR UP cases as the jury acquitted Stephanie Hubers was found not guilty of grand theft, grand theft by deception and alternative receiving stolen property charges.  In September 2018, Jackley made a plea deal with Dan Guericke the former educational cooperative director, wherein Guericke pled guilty to one felony count of falsifying evidence.  Guericke had originally been charged with six felony counts alleging that he falsified evidence and conspired to offer forged or fraudulent evidence.  In October 2018, Jackley lost his second Gear Up jury trial when the jury acquitted Stacy Phelps, the former CEO of the American Institute for Innovation, on all charges.

Supported SB70, Adult Criminal Justice Reform law (2013)
On January 18, 2013, Jackley testified before the Senate State Affairs Committee in support of SB 70.  On February 6, 2013, Governor Dennis Daugaard signed SB 70 into law.  The bill has been heavily criticized by law enforcement and public officials as being detrimental to public safety.

Supported SB 73 Juvenile Criminal Justice Reform law (2015)
On January 23, 2015, Jackley testified before the Senate State Affairs Committee in support of SB 73.  On March 13, 2015, Governor Dennis Daugaard signed SB 73 into law.

Annette Bosworth case
On Wednesday, June 4, 2014, one day after the losing the U.S. Senate primary Annette Bosworth was arrested on charges brought by Jackley regarding perjury and filing false documents.  Bosworth called the charges a “political intimidation scheme” against her by Jackley, who was appointed by then Governor and now U.S. Senator  Mike Rounds who just defeated Bosworth the day prior.  Many questioned why a plea deal could not be struck.  Bosworth stated “There’s no deal that will take away any of the felonies, so of course it’s going to trial”. “Paul Jacobs, a blogger who says he had experience with an overly aggressive prosecutor in Oklahoma over election issues several years ago. Jacobs says Jackley’s prosecution looks more like “persecution,” a line Bosworth repeats in her link to it.”    Bosworth claimed that Jackley was prosecuting her for political and personal reasons.  On May 27, 2015, Annette Bosworth was convicted via jury trial of 6 felonies for perjury and six felonies for filing false documents. On July 19, 2017, the South Dakota Supreme Court vacated the 6 convictions for perjury, but affirmed the remaining convictions. On November 3, 2017, Judge Jon Brown granted Bosworth a suspended imposition of sentence, which means she no longer has any felonies on her record.

Flandreau marijuana case
On August 3, 2016, Jackley filed 3 charges against Eric Hagen regarding conspiracy to possess, possession and attempt to possess more than 10 pounds of marijuana.  On May 24, 2017, a jury acquitted Hagen of all charges.  The verdict was seen as a setback for Jackley while he was running for Governor.

Gene Abdallah nomination
On October 23, 2017, Jackley appointed Gene Abdallah to the Board of Pardons and Paroles.  On November 28, 2017, a former lobbyist, Tiffany Campbell, accused Abdallah of sexual harassment when he was in the legislature.  An appointment to the Board of Pardons and Parole must be confirmed by the state senate   On January 16, 2018, Abdallah withdrew from the Board of Pardons and Parole as a result of the reports of sexual harassment.

Laura Zylstra lawsuit
In 2011, Division of Criminal Investigation (DCI) [an agency controlled by Jackley] agent, Laura Zylstra, filed a sexual harassment claim against a former Brown County deputy who made inappropriate comments towards her. Zylstra was then demoted and transferred from Aberdeen to Pierre. She then resigned in 2012. In September 2015, Zylstra sued DCI Director Bryan Gortmaker claiming she had been retaliated against with response to sexual harassment. In December 2017, the jury awarded Zylstra $1.2 million in damages finding that she had suffered retaliation and discrimination. Zylstra thanked the jury for “giving me justice.”  She had alleged violations of the Civil Rights Act and the South Dakota Human Relations Act. In May 2018, Federal District Court Judge Charles B. Kornmann ordered DCI Director, Bryan Gortmaker, to appear in court as the state failed to pay the $1.5M settlement. Jackley claimed that the settlement was not being delayed and that Zylstra’s lawyers and his  gubernatorial opponent Kristi Noem were playing politics.  Zylstra disputed in detail that there was a delay in the payments and personally appeared in campaign ads stating “I don’t think Marty Jackley should be Governor, I don’t think he should be the Attorney General”.

2018 gubernatorial election

Candidates
In November 2016, Jackley declared his intention to seek the Republican nomination for Governor of South Dakota.  Congresswoman Kristi Noem also declared that she would seek the Republican nomination for governor. Terry LaFleur  and Lora Hubel also declared their intention to seek the Republican nomination for governor, however, LaFleur & Hubel were unable to obtain the required number of signatures to make the primary ballot.

Debates
Jackley and Noem participated in three debates.

First debate
In the first debate both candidates tried to define the other.  Jackley stated: “It’s Washington experience versus South Dakota experience.” “Marty’s background has been being a government lawyer,” Noem said.

Second debate
In the second debate, Noem discussed Marty’s scandals.  “In EB5, the state oversight program, nobody went to jail. On Gear-Up, still, nobody’s been punished. When we talk about what’s been going on in Brookings with the Global Aquaponics scam—a con artist, Tobias Ritesman, held a fundraiser for Marty Jackley. Marty attended his phony groundbreaking for his phony project,” Noem says. “People lost hundreds of thousands of dollars. Still, nobody’s been investigated and nobody’s been prosecuted. That needs to change in our state.”

Jackley was on the defensive during the second debate.  “Congresswoman, he didn’t hold a fundraiser for me. I was at an event that he was at, and I did go to a ground breaking because that’s what important in South Dakota,” Jackley says. “When we have businesses expanding I think it’s important that we attend those. You talk about Gear-Up, there hasn’t been a sentencing because these defendants are presumed innocent. But I as attorney general, unlike Washington, have done something about it. I actually formed a grand jury. Indictments have been issued. They’re schedule to begin jury trials in July—or, excuse me—June, June 26th and I plan on trying those personally, because that’s what a leader does.”

Final debate
In the final debate, Jackley and Noem took questions about workforce development, anti-discrimination laws, drugs, uniting democrats and republicans in the state to make critical decisions and much more. A subject of disagreement was the state's 134 boards and commissions. Noem said she wanted to streamline different processes for licensure, eliminating "red tape" but Jackley disagreed.  "Every time that a proposal comes forward to create a new 'blue ribbon' task force, a board or a commission, what typically comes with that is another layer of bureaucracy," Noem said.  Jackley defended the government bureaucracy.  "We need a governor that understands that various different boards, isn't out there criticizing different boards and saying that type of service isn't important," Jackley said.  Jackley spoke about putting together a task force to work on government transparency and open records laws.  "I'm committed when I become governor to put forth a taskforce ...because we need to take a look at the open records law," he said.  They both ended the debate with a jab at the other.  "It really comes to down to Washington experience versus South Dakota experience," Jackley said. "The congresswoman has been spending considerable time and effort talking about Marty Jackley, but I'm talking about you, South Dakota."  "Days ago he stood up and talked about protecting victims while behind the scenes he was actively working to silence one to further his political career," Noem said. "You deserve a governor who will be honest with you, who will tell you the truth and who is willing to be accountable."

Primary results
Jackley lost in the June primary to U.S. Representative Kristi Noem.  Jackley only won 7 of South Dakota's 66 counties.  Jackley received 45,069 (44%) votes and Noem received 57,437 (56%) votes.

Private sector (2019–2022)
After the election, Jackley rejoined the firm of Gunderson, Palmer, Nelson and Ashmore and opened up a law office in Pierre, South Dakota. On August 27, 2019, Marty was sworn in as the Jones County States Attorney.

Measure 24
In 2017, an initiated measure was started to ban financial contributions from out of state residents, political committees and entities to ballot question committees.  On June 14, 2017, the Legislative Research Counsel, proposed edits to the Initiated Measure. On July 31, 2017, Jackley, while serving as Attorney General, submitted his Attorney General’s explanation regarding IM 24 to the Secretary of State pursuant to SDCL 12-13-25.1. IM 24 passed with 174,960 (55.52%) votes for the initiated measure and 140,172 (44.48%) votes against it.  On March 4, 2019, South Dakota Voice, a grassroots ballot question committee, headed by Cory Heidelberger, filed a lawsuit to stop IM 24. On April 17, 2019, a complaint was filed against the state to invalidate IM 24 by Jackley approximately six weeks after initial lawsuit by Heidelberger and despite having written the Attorney General explanation for the state. On May 9, 2019, Federal Judge Charles Kornmann struck down IM 24. South Dakota Voice was awarded attorney fees from the state in the amount of $32,100; expenses in the amount of $1,083.90 and costs in the amount of $505.40.  Jackley was awarded attorney fees for his clients nearly three times of South Dakota Voice in the amount of $79,640.00, despite starting six weeks after the South Dakota Voice complaint.

Representation of T. Denny Sanford

In 2020, it was reported that T. Denny Sanford, the richest man in South Dakota, was being investigated for possession of child pornography.  Sanford was represented by Jackley.  Investigators obtained a search warrant before referring the case to the United States Department of Justice. The investigation has led several institutions towards reconsideration of his philanthropy.

On October 27, 2021, the South Dakota Supreme Court unanimously ruled against the "Implicated Individual" that search warrants that were sought will be unsealed, pending any motion(s) for rehearing.  On November 17, 2021, the South Dakota Supreme Court unsealed records confirming that T. Denny Sanford was the implicated individual and that five search warrants were issued during the investigation.  The documents included the contents of the warrants, the return of the warrant and the inventory dating back to 2019.

Attorney General of South Dakota (2023–present)

2022 attorney general election

On March 1, 2021, Jackley announced that he would run for attorney general in the 2022 election. He won the general election unopposed.

Personal life
Marty lives in Pierre, South Dakota, with his two children, Michael and Isabella.

On October 18, 2019, Marty and Angela were divorced citing irreconcilable differences.

Electoral history

References

External links

|-

|-

|-

|-

1970 births
2012 United States presidential electors
2016 United States presidential electors
21st-century American politicians
Living people
People from Sturgis, South Dakota
South Dakota Attorneys General
South Dakota Republicans
South Dakota School of Mines and Technology alumni
United States Attorneys for the District of South Dakota
University of South Dakota School of Law alumni